The Restorative Liberal Revolution, also known as the Invasion of the 60 due to the number of men with whom the movement began, was an expedition of Venezuelans exiled in Colombia under the command of Cipriano Castro that began on 23 May 1899, with the purpose of overthrowing the government of Venezuelan President Ignacio Andrade.

Origin 

So he began his revolution crossing the border of the Táchira River on 23 May 1899.

Development 
The forces of the rebels grew as they entered the Venezuelan Andean center to overthrow the unpopular Andrade government. Two days later Andrade assumed personal command of the war and Castro launched a coordinated offensive against Caracas. After this several warlords and their militias deserted to the rebel side; When Castro was preparing to confront  in La Victoria, he was surprised that General Ferrer decided to disobey the government's orders and not confront him. With ten thousand soldiers, Castro entered the capital on 23 October with generals and caudillos Luciano Mendoza, Samuel Acosta and Luis Lima Loreto. Andrade is overthrown in a coup and forced into exile on Curaçao.

Timeline of the revolution 

 24 May: The Sixty pass through Capacho, where they are joined by 120 more men from the Castro party, including Eleazar López Contreras. Hours later, the Restoration Army carried out an ambush in Tononó on the government troops with a triumph for the restorers.
 27 May: The rebels, already with 400 troops, are located in Las Pilas, near San Cristóbal, and attack the government reinforcements with a new revolutionary victory.
 28 May: The restorers settle in Táriba where they reorganize their forces.
After four hours of intense fighting, the government is defeated.
 16 June: Castro and his troops return to San Cristóbal and besiege it.
 23-24 June: The restorers attack the city, which was defended by General Juan Pablo Peñaloza. The city could not be taken.
 12 July: Castro lifts the siege in the face of the proximity of 4,000 government troops under the command of Antonio Fernández.
 27 July: The restorers face the continuationist troops in the Combat of Cordero. The government artillery forces the restorers to fall back towards Palmira.
 28 July: After 18 hours of exchanges, the continuistas manage to regroup with Peñaloza in San Cristóbal.
 31 July: Castro and the restorers advance on their way to Mérida and Trujillo.
 2 August: The restaurateurs decide to set off towards the center of the country. Days later they camp in Tovar.
 5 August: The rebels take Bailadores.
After a fierce battle, the town was taken.
 9 August: Castro and the restorers arrive in Mérida.
 16 August: They occupy Valera.
 22 August: The rebels take Carora and continue their march.
 26 August: Castro and the restorers stopped in Parapara before a flood of the Tocuyo River. A contingent under the command of Elías Torres Aular and Lorenzo Guevara attacked them. Castro defeated Torres in the rear, while Guevara retreated. The rebels captured a Krupp cannon.
 1 September: Castro and the restorers passed through Barquisimeto without being attacked. The rebels ran through Yaritagua, Urachiche and Chivacoa.
 8 September: The rebels presented combat to General Rosendo Medina in Nirgua. Medina was defeated.
 12 September: Castro arrived in Tocuyito in command of almost two thousand soldiers and camped there. The government organized a large army in Valencia with a view to definitively stopping the restoration movement
 14 September: Castro, outnumbered 2 to 1, battled government forces in the town of Tocuyito. President Andrade was present in La Victoria to lead the battle. The continuing Generals Diego Bautista Ferrer and Antonio Fernández followed contradictory orders issued by the President himself. The military maneuvers ordered by Castro, added to the crossed orders of the President, sowed chaos in the government troops that undertook the withdrawal.
 16 September: The rebels took Valencia. As a result of the result of the Battle of Tocuyito, senior government leaders begin to negotiate the outcome with Castro. Finance Minister Manuel Antonio Matos acted as intermediary.
 19 October: Ignacio Andrade decided to leave the Presidency. He boarded the boat Bolívar and left for exile on the Island of Saint Thomas. Vice President Víctor Rodríguez assumed power temporarily.
 22 October: Castro triumphantly entered Caracas, definitively defeating the government.

See also 

 1908 Venezuelan coup d'état

References 

Wars involving Venezuela
1890s in Venezuela
Civil wars involving the states and peoples of South America